ComputerScope was a computer magazine edited and produced by the publishing company MediaTeam in Dublin, Ireland.

History
ComputerScope was first published in 1984 by the Scope Communications Group. It was then published by MediaTeam Ltd, which was formed when CPG and Scope Communications merged in 2005. The magazine was edited by Paul Hearns.

Description
ComputerScope was a monthly end-user Information and Communications Technology magazine targeting IT professionals in the public and private sectors in Ireland. It was distributed as a request-only, controlled circulation publication; readers must qualify to receive a free subscription. Those who did not meet the criteria to receive free copies could obtain a paid subscription..

ComputerScope was audited by the Audit Bureau of Circulations (UK); the website claimed to have 10,000 readers. The magazine and its sister title Irish Computer were both replaced by TechCentral.ie.

MediaTeam
MediaTeam also published three other ICT titles: Irish Computer, Smart Company, and PCLive!, plus Shelflife and The Irish Garden. MediaTeam is a member of the Periodical Publishers Association of Ireland.

References

External links
 ComputerScope.ie

Defunct computer magazines
Magazines published in Ireland
Magazines established in 1984
Monthly magazines published in Ireland
Mass media in Dublin (city)
Defunct magazines published in Ireland
Magazines with year of disestablishment missing